The Gaiety Theatre (1908–1949) or Gayety Theatre of Boston, Massachusetts, was located at no.661 Washington Street near Boylston Street in today's Boston Theater District. It featured burlesque, vaudeville and cinema. Performers included Clark and McCullough, Solly Ward, and Lena Daley; producers included Charles H. Waldron, Earl Carroll, and E.M. Loew. In 1949 it became the "Publix Theatre." The building existed until its razing in 2005.

References

External links

 Library of Congress. Drawing of Gayety Theatre (Burlesque), Washington St. near La Grange St., Boston, Massachusetts, 1922.
 Ohio State University. Charles H. McCaghy Collection of Exotic Dance From Burlesque to Clubs. Includes materials related to the Boston Gayety Theatre
 Friends of the Gaiety Theatre
 Flickr. Photos, 2000s

Images

Vaudeville theaters
Burlesque theatres
20th century in Boston
Boston Theater District
1908 establishments in Massachusetts
Former theatres in Boston
Event venues established in 1908
Former cinemas in the United States
Chinatown, Boston
Demolished buildings and structures in Boston
Buildings and structures demolished in 2005
2005 disestablishments in Massachusetts
Theatres completed in 1908